Lynch Davidson was an American politician who served as the Lieutenant Governor of Texas from 1921 to 1923.

Biography 
Davidson was born on January 3, 1873, in Cotile Landing, Louisiana, now Boyce, Louisiana, to Lieutenant William Neal Davidson and Laura Cecelia Lynch, a native of Washington County, Texas whose father Joseph Penn Lynch was a veteran of the Texas Revolution, and served primarily during the Battle of San Jacinto. Davidson moved to Groesbeck, Texas as in infant. He remained in Groesbeck until 1887, when he finished high school at age 15 and moved to Houston. Upon his move, he immediately set out to become a lumberman in order to support his widowed mother. He was able to secure a job at a sawmill in Groveton. After 5 years of selling lumber in Mexico, he opened his own business in Laredo at the age of 23. He was married to Katie Calvert in June 1897, and they had three daughters, Marion, Lois, and Katie. He died on January 27, 1952, in Houston, and was buried in Hollywood Cemetery (also in Houston).

References

External links 
 Lynch Davidson on Find a Grave

1873 births
Lieutenant Governors of Texas
1952 deaths